The Kokkilai offensive was an attack on the Sri Lanka Army encampment in Kokkilai, Mullaitivu District, Sri Lanka, on the night of 13 February 1985 by the Tamil Tigers. It was the first direct assault on a Sri Lanka military base by a Tamil militant group in the early stages of the Sri Lankan Civil War. 

The outpost in the Kokkilai was commanded by Lieutenant Shantha Wijesinghe when it came under attack on the night of 13 February 1985 by a large group of militants. It was the first time the militants made use of RPGs. The garrison held out and received reinforcements by morning. 14 bodies of militants were found outside the camp perimeter dressed in military type uniforms and with night vision glasses. Ravi Jayewardene, National Security Adviser of then President of Sri Lanka J.R. Jayewardene reported to the National Security Council that the Kokkilai attack was a full-scale armed confrontation and said the Tamil Tigers were becoming a ‘sophisticated enemy.’ It is believed the Tamil Tiger Ranjan Kanagaratnam died in this attack. Lieutenant Shantha Wijesinghe received a field promotion to Captain, the first time in the army’s history.

See also
 List of Sri Lankan Civil War battles

References

Battles of Eelam War I
Military history of Sri Lanka
1985 in Sri Lanka
Conflicts in 1985
20th-century conflicts